Lordship was a New Zealand–bred Standardbred pacer. He won two New Zealand Trotting Cup races, the richest harness race, and sometimes the richest horse race in New Zealand. He won 45 races and as a leading sire, he sustained the Globe Derby sireline through his successful sons.

In 1962, as a four-year-old, he beat the great champion racehorse Cardigan Bay in the New Zealand Trotting Cup on a rain-affected track. He was a bit of a mudlark and won the 1966 version of the Cup, again on a wet track.

He won the following major races:
 1962 New Zealand Trotting Cup 
 1964 Auckland Pacing Cup
 1966 New Zealand Trotting Cup

See also
 Harness racing in New Zealand

References

External links
 Register of Standardbred Stallions
 Lordship in the 1962 NZ Cup 
 Lordship in the 1966 NZ Cup

Auckland Pacing Cup winners
Harness racing in New Zealand
New Zealand standardbred racehorses
New Zealand Trotting Cup winners
1958 racehorse births